Oxystigma is a genus of damselflies in the family Heteragrionidae, comprising 3 species.

Species
 Oxystigma caerulans De Marmels, 1987
 Oxystigma cyanofrons Williamson, 1919
 Oxystigma petiolatum (Selys, 1862)

References 

Zygoptera genera
Calopterygoidea